Martin Sjølie (born April 25, 1979 in Bærum, Norway) is a Norwegian songwriter and record producer, most known for his work with artists Sigrid, Maria Mena and Dotan. Although he is based at his own Studio in the Park, in Oslo, Norway, he mainly works on projects in the UK. Sjølie has recently worked with, among others, Sam Smith, Ella Henderson, Maiday, Iain James, Lindy Robbins and The Nexus.

Career

Sjølie is published by Kobalt Music Group and managed by Advanced Alternative Media Inc. He is the general manager of his own company, In The Park AS, which was founded in 2002 and is engaged in performing artists and entertainment activities in music.

Songwriting and Production Discography

References

External links

Norwegian songwriters
Norwegian musicians
Living people
1979 births